Joseph James Guillaume Paul Martin  (June 23, 1903 – September 14, 1992), often referred to  as Paul Martin Sr.,  was a noted Canadian politician and diplomat. He was the father of Paul Martin, who served as 21st prime minister of Canada from 2003 to 2006.

Early life
Martin was born in Ottawa, Ontario, the son of Lumina (née Chouinard) and Joseph Philippe Ernest Martin. His Irish Catholic paternal grandfather's family immigrated from County Mayo, and his mother and paternal grandmother were French Canadian with deep roots in the country.

Martin contracted polio in 1907, which left him permanently blind in one eye and with a severely weakened left arm.

Martin was raised in Pembroke, Ontario, in the Ottawa River Valley, although he attended high school at Collège Saint-Alexandre in Gatineau, Quebec. He completed his university education at the University of Toronto, and earned his law degree from Osgoode Hall Law School. Later, Martin studied at the Graduate Institute of International Studies, Geneva, on a scholarship.

Martin later opened a law practice in Windsor, Ontario.

Politics

Member of Parliament
A member of the Liberal Party of Canada, he was first elected to the House of Commons in 1935 and entered the cabinet in 1945.  He went on to serve as a noted member of the cabinets of four Prime Ministers: William Lyon Mackenzie King, Louis St. Laurent, Lester B. Pearson and Pierre Trudeau.

Martin was viewed as one of the most left-wing members of the Liberal cabinet, and as Minister of National Health and Welfare from 1946 to 1957 he played an important role in the fight against polio and overseeing the creation of hospital insurance in Canada, and is sometimes recognized as a father of medicare. Martin served as Secretary of State for External Affairs in the Pearson government, and was instrumental in the acquisition of U.S. nuclear weapons for Canadian Forces.

Liberal leadership bids
He ran for the Liberal leadership three times, in 1948, in 1958 and 1968, but was defeated at all three Liberal leadership conventions, first by Louis St. Laurent, then by Lester B. Pearson, then by Pierre Trudeau.

Senator and beyond
Trudeau appointed him to the Senate in 1968.  He served as Leader of the Government in the Senate until 1974 when he was appointed High Commissioner to the United Kingdom. He also served as Chancellor of Wilfrid Laurier University from 1972 to 1977, as a result of which the university named the Paul Martin Centre in his honour. Until his death Paul Martin was an Adjunct Professor of Political Science at the University of Windsor.

His two volume memoirs, A Very Public Life, was published in 1983 and 1986.

Honours
In 1976 he was made a Companion of the Order of Canada. In recognition of his accomplishments, Martin was granted the right to use the honorific Right Honourable in 1992, a rare honour for one who has never been Prime Minister, Governor-General or Chief Justice of Canada. He died on September 14, at the age of eighty-nine.

The University of Windsor has a Paul Martin Chair in law and political science, recently held by former Manitoba Premier Howard Pawley (until his retirement from the university), and the Paul Martin Law Library. The City of Windsor had also renamed their "Post Office Building" the Paul Martin Sr. Building in his honour on November 18, 1994.

Honorary Degrees

Electoral record

Essex East

|}

   
|}

|}

|}

|}

|}

|}

|}

|}

|}

Archives 
There is a Paul Joseph Martin fonds at Library and Archives Canada.

See also
Vive le Québec libre speech
Paul Martin

References

Further reading
Donaghy, Greg. Grit: The Life and Politics of Paul Martin Sr. (Vancouver: UBC Press, 2015). Pp. 480

External links

 
A retiring Paul Martin gives a CBC Interview

1903 births
1992 deaths
20th-century Canadian lawyers
Canadian memoirists
Canadian Roman Catholics
Canadian Secretaries of State for External Affairs
Canadian senators from Ontario
Canadian people of Irish descent
Canadian university and college chancellors
Companions of the Order of Canada
Franco-Ontarian people
Lawyers in Ontario
Liberal Party of Canada leadership candidates
Liberal Party of Canada MPs
Liberal Party of Canada senators
Paul Sr.
Members of the House of Commons of Canada from Ontario
Members of the King's Privy Council for Canada
Politicians from Ottawa
Politicians from Windsor, Ontario
Writers from Ottawa
Writers from Windsor, Ontario
University of Toronto alumni
Graduate Institute of International and Development Studies alumni
Academic staff of University of Windsor
High Commissioners of Canada to the United Kingdom
People with polio
Canadian politicians with disabilities
Parents of prime ministers of Canada
20th-century memoirists